Musique is the French word for music. 

Musique may also refer to:

Music
Musique (disco band), a 1970s studio band produced by Patrick Adams
Musique, a British dance act consisting of Moussa Clarke and Nick Hanson best known for their 2001 song "New Year's Dub", which samples the U2 song "New Year's Day".

Albums
Musique (album), a 2000 album of Theatre of Tragedy
Musique Vol. 1 1993–2005, an anthology of Daft Punk tracks
La Musique (fr), album by Dominique A 2009

Songs	
"Musique", a single by France Gall, written Michel Berger 1977
"Musique", a song by Herb Alpert from Just You and Me 1976
"Musique", a song by Daft Punk from Musique Vol. 1 1993–2005 
La Musique (Angelica), a 1967 song of Star Academy France

See also
Musique concrète
Musique-Cordiale